Nevėžis may refer to:

Nevėžis, a river in Lithuania
BC Nevėžis, a basketball team from Kėdainiai, Lithuania
FK Nevėžis, a football team from Kėdainiai, Lithuania